Luis Alberto Fuente (born 11 March 1981) is a Mexican professional boxer and is the former Mexican National Featherweight Champion.

Professional career

Mexico National Championship
In October 2001, Fuente beat the veteran Oscar Galindo by T.K.O. to win the Mexican National Featherweight title.

On September 12, 2003 Fuente lost to Humberto Soto at the Orleans Hotel and Casino in Las Vegas, Nevada.

References

External links

Boxers from Yucatán (state)
Sportspeople from Mérida, Yucatán
Welterweight boxers
1981 births
Living people
Mexican male boxers